Bokela Airport  is an airport serving Bokela, a hamlet on the Lomela River in Tshuapa Province, Democratic Republic of the Congo.

See also

 Transport in the Democratic Republic of the Congo
 List of airports in the Democratic Republic of the Congo

References

External links
 OpenStreetMap - Bokela Airport
 OurAirports - Bokela Airport
 FallingRain - Bokela Airport
 

Airports in Tshuapa Province